Emanuel County is a county located in the U.S. state of Georgia. As of the 2020 census, the population was 22,768. The county seat is Swainsboro.

History
The county was created on December 10, 1812, by an act of the Georgia General Assembly from land originally in parts of Bulloch and Montgomery counties. Emanuel County is named in honor of former Governor of Georgia David Emanuel.

Portions of Johnson (1858), Jenkins (1905), Toombs (1905), Candler (1914), and Treutlen (1918) counties were taken from Emanuel's original borders.

Courthouses
Emanuel County has had seven courthouses in its over 200 years of existence. In the county's early years, the court met at Steven Rich's home. Emanuel County's first courthouse was erected in 1814 and burned in 1841. It wasn't until 1854, the same time that the city of Swainsboro was formally incorporated, that the county was allowed to build a replacement. In a string of bad luck, this new courthouse burned in 1855 and was replaced by another courthouse, which burned in 1857. Emanuel County's fourth courthouse burned in 1919 and was replaced by a three-story brick structure which, characteristically, burned in 1938. The next courthouse, a two-story marble structure, was built in 1940 and was the first courthouse in Emanuel County's history not to be destroyed by fire. However, by the 1990s, the courthouse's cramped and deteriorating condition caused several county offices to vacate the courthouse and move into vacant office space surrounding the courthouse square. The courthouse was demolished in the spring of 2000, leaving only the sheriff's office annex. In the late 1990s, the Emanuel County commissioners purchased the former U.S. Post Office building, which was built in 1936, to serve as an interim courthouse. In 2000, the county commission acquired land adjacent to the old Post Office to build a new courthouse and sheriff's office. Emanuel County's current courthouse, a large, single story brick structure incorporating the old Post Office building, was completed in 2002, and a city square was built on the former courthouse site with the old sheriff's office renovated to serve as the city's visitors' center as well as the office for Swainsboro-Emanuel County Chamber of Commerce.

Geography

The northern portion of Emanuel County, centered on Summertown and defined by a southern border heading from Garfield east-northeast and running north of Modoc, is located in the Upper Ogeechee River sub-basin of the Ogeechee River basin. The eastern portion of the county, east of Swainsboro, is located in the Canoochee River sub-basin of the same Ogeechee River basin. The western and southern portions of Emanuel County are located in the Ohoopee River sub-basin of the Altamaha River basin.

Major highways

  Interstate 16
  U.S. Route 1
  U.S. Route 1 Business
  U.S. Route 80
  U.S. Route 221
  State Route 4
  State Route 4 Business
  State Route 15
  State Route 23
  State Route 26
  State Route 46
  State Route 56
  State Route 57
  State Route 78
  State Route 86
  State Route 121
  State Route 171
  State Route 192
  State Route 297
  State Route 404 (unsigned designation for I-16)

Adjacent counties

 Jefferson County - north
 Jenkins County - northeast
 Burke County - northeast
 Candler County - east
 Tattnall County - southeast
 Bulloch County - southeast
 Toombs County - south
 Laurens County - southwest
 Johnson County - west
 Treutlen County - west

Demographics

2000 census
As of the census of 2000, there were 21,837 people, 8,045 households, and 5,752 families living in the county.  The population density was 32 people per square mile (12/km2).  There were 9,419 housing units at an average density of 14 per square mile (5/km2).  The racial makeup of the county was 63.69% White, 33.28% Black or African American, 0.14% Native American, 0.24% Asian, 2.13% from other races, and 0.51% from two or more races.  3.41% of the population were Hispanic or Latino of any race.

There were 8,045 households, out of which 34.30% had children under the age of 18 living with them, 50.10% were married couples living together, 17.10% had a female householder with no husband present, and 28.50% were non-families. 25.00% of all households were made up of individuals, and 11.10% had someone living alone who was 65 years of age or older.  The average household size was 2.61 and the average family size was 3.10.

In the county, the population was spread out, with 27.80% under the age of 18, 10.40% from 18 to 24, 26.00% from 25 to 44, 22.40% from 45 to 64, and 13.30% who were 65 years of age or older.  The median age was 35 years. For every 100 females there were 92.80 males.  For every 100 females age 18 and over, there were 90.50 males.

The median income for a household in the county was $24,383, and the median income for a family was $31,113. Males had a median income of $26,605 versus $18,145 for females. The per capita income for the county was $13,627.  About 21.80% of families and 27.40% of the population were below the poverty line, including 36.70% of those under age 18 and 27.50% of those age 65 or over.

2010 census
As of the 2010 United States Census, there were 22,598 people, 8,430 households, and 5,833 families living in the county. The racial makeup of the county was 61.6% white, 33.5% black or African American, 0.7% Asian, 0.3% American Indian, 3.0% from other races, and 0.9% from two or more races. Those of Hispanic or Latino origin made up 4.1% of the population. In terms of ancestry, 12.9% were American, 8.0% were English, and 7.3% were Irish.

Of the 8,430 households, 35.9% had children under the age of 18 living with them, 44.9% were married couples living together, 19.1% had a female householder with no husband present, 30.8% were non-families, and 26.5% of all households were made up of individuals. The average household size was 2.57 and the average family size was 3.10. The median age was 36.8 years.

The median income for a household in the county was $30,205 and the median income for a family was $36,402. Males had a median income of $31,434 versus $23,340 for females. The per capita income for the county was $16,076. About 17.0% of families and 24.2% of the population were below the poverty line, including 35.8% of those under age 18 and 13.3% of those age 65 or over.

2020 census

As of the 2020 United States census, there were 22,768 people, 8,387 households, and 5,683 families residing in the county.

Communities

Cities

 Adrian
 Garfield
 Nunez
 Oak Park
 Stillmore
 Summertown
 Swainsboro
 Twin City

Census-designated places
 Canoochee
 Norristown

Unincorporated communities
 Five Points, Georgia
 Stevens Crossing, Georgia

Politics
Since 1964, the only times the county has failed to back a Republican candidate in a presidential election were when southern Democrats Jimmy Carter and Bill Clinton were on the ballot.

See also

 National Register of Historic Places listings in Emanuel County, Georgia
List of counties in Georgia

References

External links
 The New Georgia Encyclopedia entry for Emanuel County
 Emanuel County history at GeorgiaInfo website
 Emanuel County historical marker
 Summerville historical marker

 
1812 establishments in Georgia (U.S. state)
Populated places established in 1812
Georgia (U.S. state) counties